Chapssal doughnuts are Korean doughnuts made with glutinous rice flour. The mildly sweet doughnuts are often filled with sweetened red bean paste and coated with the mixture of sugar and cinnamon powder. Glutinous rice flour dough creates the crunchy outside texture and chewy inside texture. Beside food stalls in traditional markets, the doughnuts are also sold through franchise bakeries such as Dunkin' Donuts Korea and Paris Baguette.

Etymology 
The Korean compound chapssal-doneot literally means "glutinous rice doughnut", as chapssal refers to "glutinous rice" and doneot is a loanword from the English word "doughnut".

See also 
 An-doughnut
 Bánh rán
 Jian dui
 Twisted doughnut
 List of doughnut varieties
 List of fried dough foods
 Oliebol

References 

Glutinous rice dishes
Doughnuts
Korean snack food
Street food in South Korea
Legume dishes
Stuffed desserts
Rice flour dishes